Aleptina clinopetes is a moth of the family Noctuidae. It is found in southern Arizona and Mexico.

References

Moths described in 1920
Acronictinae
Moths of North America
Moths of Central America